The Catskill Mountain Railway (CMRy) was a  narrow gauge railroad,  long, running from Catskill to Palenville in Greene County, New York.  Organized as the Catskill Mountain Railroad (CMRR) in 1880, it bas built in 1881 and 1882.  The principals had interests in shipping on the Hudson and in hotels in the Catskill Mountains.

Unlike most railroads, the CMRR was built primarily for the purpose of transporting passengers and was intended to operate seasonally.  Most people using the line were summer tourists who travelled by steamboat from points along the Hudson River.  Their final destinations were hotels and boarding houses located high in the Catskill Mountains.  While the railroad served its purpose of bringing passengers closer to the mountain top resorts, it still left them with an arduous hour-long stage trip up the face of the  Catskill Escarpment (also known as the Wall of Manitou).  In 1885 a branch was built to Cairo, New York, with the intent to carry bluestone, hay and fruit, and was run year round.  That same year, the CMRR was reorganized as the Catskill Mountain Railway.

Competition 

Competition soon arose, in the form of the Stony Clove & Catskill Mountain and the Kaaterskill railroad companies, both controlled by the Ulster and Delaware Railroad. These narrow gauge railroads brought passengers much closer to their final destinations, saving them the difficult stage trip CMRR patrons had. To counter the competition, the Otis Elevating Railway was formed, hiring the company of Elisha Otis's sons to build a cable railroad. This railroad was completed in 1892.  in length, it raised passengers  in 10 minutes - saving a one-hour stage ride.  At the summit,  of track was laid to connect with the terminus of the Kaaterskill Railroad.

By 1897 connecting service on the Kaaterskill Railroad had become so bad, that a new railroad, the Catskill and Tannersville Railway was constructed to run from the Otis to Tannersville. This line paralleled the existing Katterskill one as far as Tannersville. Hastily built, this line had curves as sharp as 20 degrees and a maximum speed of 7 miles per hour. Locally, it was affectionately known as the "Huckleberry" for the fruit which grew along its right of way.

During a 1904 reconstruction of the Otis, a switch was installed to connect with the C&T permitting through freight to operate from Catskill to Tannersville. Because of the slanted seats necessary on the Otis, passengers still had to change cars.

A great boon to the CMRR was the development of the shale brick in 1888 by the Elmira Shale Brick Company. By 1898, raw material mined on the Cairo branch for the Catskill Shale brick company comprised, by tonnage, 95% of the freight carried.

The last trains were run in 1918.

Route

The train route ran from Cairo, southeast to Catskill and then Catskill Landing. Catskill provided a connection to the New York Central's West Shore Railroad trains from Albany to Weehawken, New Jersey. The Catskill Landing location provided a connection for boats across the Hudson River to Hudson, New York. Service between Cairo Junction and Palenville and Otis Summit on the C&T Railway was available in the summer months only.

Locomotives

Passenger Cars

Freight Cars

External links
 Catskill Mountain Railway

References
 

Defunct New York (state) railroads
3 ft gauge railways in the United States
Narrow gauge railroads in New York (state)
Catskills
Railway companies established in 1880
Railway companies disestablished in 1918